{{DISPLAYTITLE:C23H23ClN6O2}}
The molecular formula C23H23ClN6O2 (molar mass: 450.921 g/mol) may refer to:

 Daridorexant, formerly known as nemorexant
 Suvorexant

Molecular formulas